István Varga (born 23 June 1956) is a Hungarian politician and economist, who served as Minister of National Development and Economy between 2009 and 2010. Gordon Bajnai appointed him on 29 April 2009, after Tamás Vahl withdrew from the designation of the ministerial position. Before that the acting economy minister was Péter Hónig between 14 and 29 April. Varga is married and has three children.

References
 Prime Minister's Office

|-

1956 births
Living people
Government ministers of Hungary
Members of the Bajnai Government
Economy ministers
People from Sajószentpéter
Hungarian economists